A boggy uterus is a finding upon physical examination where the uterus is more flaccid than would be expected.

It can be associated with uterine atony.

It may also be associated with adenomyosis.

References

Pathology of pregnancy, childbirth and the puerperium